Erich Wiedemann (born 1942) is a German journalist and editor (at the Hamburg desk) for the weekly news magazine Der Spiegel, where he began as a reporter in 1988. For the FDP, he was also a member of the city council of Jesteburg and a representative for the Harburg district.

Wiedemann has written on German minorities in other European countries and on socio-economic developments in post-World War II Germany. A Spiegel article on the Netherlands from 1994, in which Wiedemann argued that the country had lost its reputation for tolerance and suffered an identity crisis, caused a stir among the Dutch: Wiedemann reiterated a number of cliches about the Dutch, leading to a backlash from Dutch newspaper writers and critics. The accompanying image by Sebastian Krüger depicted Frau Antje, a Dutch character used to promote cheese and other export articles, with a joint in her mouth, heroin syringes in her arm, and a case of Heineken, in a landscape of dirty tulips and polluting smokestacks.

His articles have also appeared in translation in Salon, through an arrangement with Der Spiegel.

References

External links 
 "Frau Antje in den Wechseljahren", from  Der Spiegel

Living people
German journalists
German male journalists
German male writers
1942 births
Der Spiegel people